Pinky Agnew, MNZM (born 1955 in Port Chalmers) is an actor, author, social commentator, and wedding celebrant based in Wellington in New Zealand . She has been a full-time performer and entertainer since 1990. In 2004 she appeared in the New Year's Honours list, becoming a member of the New Zealand Order of Merit (MNZM) for her services to entertainment.

Agnew has been a wedding celebrant since 1996 and has been part of several hundred weddings.  As well as weddings, she officiates at civil unions, naming ceremonies, and funerals.

Agnew appears frequently on radio in New Zealand and has featured in television shows impersonating Jenny Shipley, who served as Prime Minister of New Zealand from 1997 to 1999.

Plays
 Hens' Teeth Women's Comedy Company (1994–2002)
 The Power Breakfast (1994–1998)
 An Evening with Elvis-Anne
 Pinky Pops In
 The Truth about Love (2003) - a musical comedy
 The Candidates (2005) - a political comedy
 Party Girls (2011) - an election year comedy
 Sex Drive (2011) - a comedy about decisions in a women's life
 Destination Beehive (2014) - an election year political comedy

Pinky was one of the cast of Grumpy Old Woman Live, which toured all of New Zealand in March 2010 and again in a "mini tour" in September 2010.

Books
 Heartsongs (Random House 2004) - a compilation of readings for weddings
 Lifesongs (Random House 2006) - readings for life's milestones
 Pinky's Poems (self published 2007) - collection of comic poems

Television
 Love Mussel (2001) - about the unique properties of a New Zealand shellfish
 McPhail Gadsby (1998) - a political satire

Radio
 The Pink Report (current) - weekly social commentary on Newstalk ZB in Wellington
 Nine To Noon with Kathryn Ryan (current) - monthly commentary with Te Radar on Radio New Zealand

References

External links

 Official website

1955 births
Living people
People from Port Chalmers
New Zealand actresses
New Zealand women dramatists and playwrights
New Zealand comedians
New Zealand women comedians
20th-century New Zealand women writers
21st-century New Zealand women writers
20th-century New Zealand dramatists and playwrights
21st-century New Zealand dramatists and playwrights